Mike Tempesta is a rock guitarist and an artist relations manager. He also goes by the moniker M.33. He was credited for rhythm guitar tech on the 1990 Anthrax album Persistence of Time and his guitar solo in their Album/Song "Stomp 442,"/"American Pompeii". Before his career as a musician, he was a guitar technician for Anthrax's Scott Ian. He was a member of Human Waste Project, and played rhythm guitar in the band Powerman 5000 until his departure in 2004. He performed on the debut album of Scum of the Earth, once again with his brother John Tempesta, and has since left the lineup. After leaving Powerman 5000, he took up a job as an artist relations manager for Yamaha Corporation of America, but soon left and eventually was hired as an artist relations manager for Fender Musical Instruments Corporation, overseeing the Jackson, Charvel, and EVH brands.

A Schecter guitar was branded with his name.

References

American heavy metal guitarists
Living people
American people of Italian descent
Year of birth missing (living people)
Powerman 5000 members
Scum of the Earth (band) members